The Roman Maid is a 1724 tragedy by the British writer Robert Hurst. It is set during the reign of the Roman Emperor Diocletian.

The original cast included John Ogden as Dioclesian, Thomas Walker as Galerius Caesar, Charles Hulett as Carus, Anthony Boheme as Paulinus and Anne Parker as Camilla.

References

Bibliography
 Burling, William J. A Checklist of New Plays and Entertainments on the London Stage, 1700-1737. Fairleigh Dickinson Univ Press, 1992.
 Nicoll, Allardyce. A History of Early Eighteenth Century Drama: 1700-1750. CUP Archive, 1927.

1724 plays
British plays
Tragedy plays
West End plays